Nowa Wieś Lęborska  is a village in Lębork County, Pomeranian Voivodeship, in northern Poland. It is the seat of the gmina (administrative district) called Gmina Nowa Wieś Lęborska.

In the village there is a neo-Romanesque church with a slender tower and apse and a former half-timbered inn, both buildings from the mid-19th century.

For details of the history of the region, see History of Pomerania.

The village has a population of 2,796 as of 2022.

References

Villages in Lębork County